The New York State Sociological Association (NYSSA) is an organization of sociologists and community activists studying and or working in New York State. Founded in 1952, NYSSA holds annual academic conferences (meetings) and publishes the online journal, “The New York Sociologist” . The first NYSSA conference was hosted by Cornell University.

Papers selected by peer review for presentation at NYSSA conferences are eligible for submission to The New York Sociologist. Submissions are then peer reviewed for possible inclusion in The New York Sociologist. NYSSA also provides a platform for student participation and awards an undergraduate and a graduate paper at each Annual Meeting.

NYSSA is an organisation dedicated to providing a space for sociologists, and those interested in sociology, to present their work and exchange ideas.  NYSSA is dedicated to non-hierarchical governance with decisions made democratically through a consensus process.

According to NYSSA, membership is “made up of people teaching in the fields of Sociology, Social Work, Criminal Justice, Anthropology, and Women's studies, as well as graduate and undergraduate scholars in these fields.” The organization also claims a significant number of social workers among their members.

See also
 List of Annual NYSSA Meetings (http://newyorksociologist.org/archivemtgs.html)
 List of Keynote Speakers (http://newyorksociologist.org/archiveadresses.html)
 The New York Sociologist 
 American Sociological Association

Organizations established in 1952
Organizations based in New York (state)
1952 establishments in New York (state)
Sociological organizations